The Midsummer Mozart Festival is an annual music festival that exclusively features the music of Wolfgang Amadeus Mozart.  The festival was founded by George Cleve in 1974 and is held in the San Francisco Bay Area.

There was no festival in 2020.

References

External links

 
Midsummer Mozart Festival Collection (ARS.0066), Stanford Archive of Recorded Sound

Classical music festivals in the United States
Festivals in the San Francisco Bay Area
Mozart festivals
1974 establishments in California
Music festivals established in 1974
Annual events in California